Hamilton Gorges (1737 – 14 June 1802) was an Anglo-Irish politician. 

Gorges was the son of Richard Gorges and Elizabeth Fielding. In 1770 he was High Sheriff of Meath.

Between 1792 and 1800, he sat in the Irish House of Commons as the Member of Parliament for Meath. Despite attempts by the establishment to bribe him, he did not support the Acts of Union 1800. He subsequently represented Meath in the House of Commons of the United Kingdom from 1801 until his death in June 1802. His family had to sell much of his estate in order to pay his debts.

References

1737 births
1802 deaths
18th-century Anglo-Irish people
19th-century Anglo-Irish people
High Sheriffs of Meath
Irish MPs 1790–1797
Irish MPs 1798–1800
Members of the Parliament of Ireland (pre-1801) for County Meath constituencies
Members of the Parliament of the United Kingdom for County Meath constituencies (1801–1922)
UK MPs 1801–1802